In the mathematical field of topology, a homeomorphism (named by Henri Poincaré), topological isomorphism, or bicontinuous function is a bijective and continuous function between topological spaces that has a continuous inverse function. Homeomorphisms are the isomorphisms in the category of topological spaces—that is, they are the mappings that preserve all the topological properties of a given space. Two spaces with a homeomorphism between them are called homeomorphic, and from a topological viewpoint they are the same.

Very roughly speaking, a topological space is a geometric object, and the homeomorphism is a continuous stretching and bending of the object into a new shape. Thus, a square and a circle are homeomorphic to each other, but a sphere and a torus are not. However, this description can be misleading. Some continuous deformations are not homeomorphisms, such as the deformation of a line into a point. Some homeomorphisms are not continuous deformations, such as the homeomorphism between a trefoil knot and a circle.

An often-repeated mathematical joke is that topologists cannot tell the difference between a coffee cup and a donut, since a sufficiently pliable donut could be reshaped to the form of a coffee cup by creating a dimple and progressively enlarging it, while preserving the donut hole in the cup's handle.

Definition
A function  between two topological spaces is a homeomorphism if it has the following properties:

  is a bijection (one-to-one and onto),
  is continuous,
 the inverse function  is continuous ( is an open mapping).

A homeomorphism is sometimes called a bicontinuous function. A self-homeomorphism is a homeomorphism from a topological space onto itself. "Being homeomorphic" is an equivalence relation on topological spaces. Its equivalence classes are called homeomorphism classes.

Examples

An example of a bicontinuous mapping from the square to the disc is, in polar coordinates, 
 The graph of a differentiable function is homeomorphic to the domain of the function.
 A differentiable parametrization of a curve is a homeomorphism between the domain of the parametrization and the curve.
 A chart of a manifold is a homeomorphism between an open subset of the manifold and an open subset of a Euclidean space.
 If  is a topological group, its inversion map  is a homeomorphism. Also, for any  the left translation  the right translation  and the inner automorphism  are homeomorphisms.

Counter-examples

Notes
The third requirement, that  be continuous, is essential. Consider for instance the function  (the unit circle in ) defined by This function is bijective and continuous, but not a homeomorphism ( is compact but  is not). The function  is not continuous at the point  because although  maps  to  any neighbourhood of this point also includes points that the function maps close to  but the points it maps to numbers in between lie outside the neighbourhood.

Homeomorphisms are the isomorphisms in the category of topological spaces. As such, the composition of two homeomorphisms is again a homeomorphism, and the set of all self-homeomorphisms  forms a group, called the homeomorphism group of X, often denoted  This group can be given a topology, such as the compact-open topology, which under certain assumptions makes it a topological group.

For some purposes, the homeomorphism group happens to be too big, but by means of the isotopy relation, one can reduce this group to the mapping class group.

Properties
 Two homeomorphic spaces share the same topological properties. For example, if one of them is compact, then the other is as well; if one of them is connected, then the other is as well; if one of them is Hausdorff, then the other is as well; their homotopy and homology groups will coincide. Note however that this does not extend to properties defined via a metric; there are metric spaces that are homeomorphic even though one of them is complete and the other is not.
 A homeomorphism is simultaneously an open mapping and a closed mapping; that is, it maps open sets to open sets and closed sets to closed sets.
 Every self-homeomorphism in  can be extended to a self-homeomorphism of the whole disk  (Alexander's trick).

Informal discussion
The intuitive criterion of stretching, bending, cutting and gluing back together takes a certain amount of practice to apply correctly—it may not be obvious from the description above that deforming a line segment to a point is impermissible, for instance. It is thus important to realize that it is the formal definition given above that counts. In this case, for example, the line segment possesses infinitely many points, and therefore cannot be put into a bijection with a set containing only a finite number of points, including a single point.

This characterization of a homeomorphism often leads to a confusion with the concept of homotopy, which is actually defined as a continuous deformation, but from one function to another, rather than one space to another. In the case of a homeomorphism, envisioning a continuous deformation is a mental tool for keeping track of which points on space X correspond to which points on Y—one just follows them as X deforms. In the case of homotopy, the continuous deformation from one map to the other is of the essence, and it is also less restrictive, since none of the maps involved need to be one-to-one or onto. Homotopy does lead to a relation on spaces: homotopy equivalence.

There is a name for the kind of deformation involved in visualizing a homeomorphism. It is (except when cutting and regluing are required) an isotopy between the identity map on X and the homeomorphism from X to Y.

See also 

 
 
  is an isomorphism between uniform spaces
  is an isomorphism between metric spaces
 
 
  (closely related to graph subdivision)

References

External links

Theory of continuous functions
Functions and mappings